The Suriname Popular Song Festival (commonly called SuriPop) is a biennial song festival that has taken place in Suriname since 1982. The festival is organized by the Foundation for the Promotion of Arts and Culture in Suriname.

The event is one of the largest music events in Suriname. The first three editions of the festival were held annually, but later editions have been held every two years. The twentieth edition of the festival, SuriPop XX in 2018, was named the "Golden Edition".

History

The original idea for the festival was from Juan Navia, a Chilean musician who had moved to Suriname. He founded the organization to host this festival in 1978 together with several friends, including Ruben del Prado, Werner Duttenhofer, Leni Healy, Karin Refos and Harto Soemodihardjo. The organization was set up in the office of Healy and Duttenhofer. The first edition took place in Theater Thalia; Navia selected a composition by the French composer Franck Pourcel as the theme song.  Later editions of the festival were held in the AMOS Sports Arena, and since 2010 in the Anthony Nesty Sports Arena.

The first edition took place on 25 November 1982, two weeks before the December murders would send the mood of Surinamese society to a low point.  According to Duttenhofer, this was reflected in the sombre tone of the songs in the 1983 edition.

Since 2011, former contestants have been invited to join the SuriToppers, a supergroup which makes annual tours in the Netherlands.  The planned SuriPop in August 2020 was cancelled due to the COVID-19 pandemic in Suriname. SuriPop returned in 2022, with the final performance gala scheduled for 3 December.

Compositions

The competition has two phases: pre-selection and performance.  In the first phase, submitted compositions are primarily judged on melody and lyrics, while the performance is judged on presentation. Since the 2015 preselection, composers are no longer allowed to compete if they have previously won the event; this stipulation is meant to encourage new composing talent.  The arrangers are given full latitude, so a song could even be changed in musical style. Nevertheless, composers retain the right to withdraw a song if the result is disappointing.  After the pre-selection, twelve songs advance to the performance stage, with two additional songs held in reserve. 

At the performance evening gala, vocalists chosen by the composers perform the songs accompanied by the orchestra of SuriPop.  Navia was the first conductor of this orchestra. Since 2014, Ernesto van Dal has been the conductor.

The copyrights of the songs go to the organizing foundation.  The festival also has sponsors since the income from record sales and festival tickets is insufficient to cover the foundation's costs, which include fees for the arrangers, vocalists, language experts, music transcribers and the release of the albums and the songs.  One month before the festival, the CD album of the selected songs is released in stores.   Over the following weeks, the music videos are shown on TV.  This gives the public ample time to judge the songs and possibly discover if plagiarism has occurred.

Winners

The festival prize is awarded to the composers.  The first-place composer receives a sum of money and the Jules Chin A Foeng trophy.  The second and third prizes also include cash sums, while the other finalists receive a small fixed amount. 

Starting in 2006, arrangers have their own prize.  Since 2016, a prize is also awarded for the best music video.  

The following list shows the winning composers and songs.

References

Festivals in Suriname
Surinamese music
Surinamese awards
Song contests
Music television series
Recurring events established in 1982